Robert D. Van Kampen (1938–1999) was an American businessman, who served as a member of various organizational boards in the business world and Christian ministry.

Van Kampen's business career took him into the investment banking world, and he became one of the wealthiest men in the United States after founding the investment banking firm Van Kampen Merritt in 1974. In the 1990s, Van Kampen developed what is known today in evangelical Christian eschatology as the "Pre-Wrath” rapture position, authoring three books on the subject.

Biography
Born in Chicago, Illinois, Van Kampen was educated at Wheaton Academy in West Chicago and Wheaton College in Wheaton, Illinois, graduating in 1960.

Van Kampen Merritt
In 1968 at age 30, Van Kampen left a secure sales job at a prominent Chicago-based municipal bond firm where he was known as "The Charger". After affiliations with two other firms, in 1974, at a company in which he owned the majority interest, he led that firm's initiative to sponsor unit investment trusts paying federally tax-exempt interest. His firm was a pioneer in promoting insured unit investment trusts. After New York City's near-default in 1975, investors flocked to Van Kampen's insured trusts. In 1982, the company broke records in the industry by introducing a $125 million Insured Municipal Income Trust (IMIT), soon followed by an even larger $128.5 IMIT. By 1983, the company then known as Van Kampen Merritt, Inc. had sold nearly $7 billion of trusts and was the nation's third-largest firm in that arena. In 1984, Van Kampen sold the firm to Xerox Corporation for about $200 million.

Later businesses
As an evangelical Christian, Van Kampen was known for applying biblical principles to the running of his business, and there was a strict code of personal conduct among his many employees.  Divorce was frowned upon and the drinking of hard liquor discouraged.

Published works
Van Kampen's published work primarily focused upon development of the "pre-wrath rapture" position within Evangelical Protestant Christian eschatology. His three published books were:

 "The Sign" – A discourse on the "end times," focusing on the "Pre-Wrath Rapture"
 The Fourth Reich – A novel about the "end times": Adolf Hitler's spirit is released from Hell and enters an embryo created from his cloned DNA. He's then born in Russia and grows up to become that country's dictator, eventually revealing his true identity to the world before the UN General Assembly. Van Kampen also stated that Hitler "best meets all requirements to be the Antichrist" in his former book, The Sign
 The Rapture Question Answered

Trust
The family now controls his former assets worth approximately $200 million. A family foundation owns one of the largest private collections of rare and antique Bibles in North America, presently housed in the Scriptorium at the Holy Land Experience in Orlando, Florida.

The Holy Land Experience closed in 2021.

The trust also owned Hampton Court, Herefordshire, a later medieval country house converted into a Christian study centre. In the decade until it was sold in January 2008, approximately £12 million was invested into the restoration of Hampton Court and its surrounding parkland, including the creation of the nationally significant Van Kampen garden. There was a grand opening for the garden after his death in the summer of 2000, in which he had donated $100,000 for the Indiana Wesleyan University Chorale to come and perform for the Grand Opening.

Personal life

In 1963 he married, and he and his wife had three children.  Having initially lived in Wheaton, Illinois, Van Kampen made his home in West Chicago, Illinois, Indiana, and West Michigan. Van Kampen died at age 60, in October 1999, awaiting a heart transplant. Christian singer Robert Pierre, son of Van Kampen's daughter Karla and Scott Pierre, is Van Kampen's grandson.

References

External links
Sola Scriptura
Obituary at the New York Times

1938 births
1999 deaths
American people of Dutch descent
Businesspeople from Chicago
Wheaton College (Illinois) alumni
20th-century American businesspeople
People from West Chicago, Illinois
People from Wheaton, Illinois